Embeth Jean Davidtz (born August 11, 1965) is an American-South African actress. Her screen roles include movies such as Army of Darkness, Schindler's List, Matilda, Mansfield Park, Bicentennial Man, Fallen, Junebug, and Fracture, and the television series Mad Men, Californication, In Treatment, and Ray Donovan.

Early life
Davidtz was born in Lafayette, Indiana, to South African parents John and Jean, while her father was studying chemical engineering at Purdue University. The family later moved to Trenton, New Jersey, and then to South Africa when Davidtz was nine years old. Davidtz has Dutch, English, and French ancestry. She had to learn Afrikaans before attending school classes in South Africa, where her father took up a teaching post at Potchefstroom University. Davidtz graduated from The Glen High School in Pretoria in 1983 and studied at Rhodes University in Grahamstown.

Debut and early career
Davidtz made her acting debut at age 21 with CAPAB (Cape Performing Arts Board, now known as Artscape) in Cape Town, playing Juliet in a stage production of Romeo and Juliet at the Maynardville Open-Air Theatre. Performing in English and Afrikaans, she also starred in other local plays, including Stille Nag (Silent Night) and A Chain of Voices, both earning her nominations for the South African equivalent of the Tony Award.

Her film debut came in 1988 with a small role in South African-filmed American horror Mutator. Shortly after, she won a bigger part in South African short telemovie A Private Life, as the daughter of an interracial couple. Davidtz won a DALRO Award for Best Supporting Actress for her work in the 1990 play Houd-den-bek. For the same play, she was nominated in 1991 for the Esther Roos Award for Best Actress in a Supporting role in Afrikaans film. Steven Spielberg noticed her performance in the 1992 South African film, Nag van die Negentiende and offered her the role of Helen Hirsch in Schindler's List.

Hollywood career

In 1993, Davidtz played the role of Helen Hirsch in Steven Spielberg's Schindler's List.

In 1995, Davidtz had a central role in the fact-based film Murder in the First, and the Merchant Ivory Productions Feast of July.

In Matilda (1996), she played the role of Miss Honey, the first-grade teacher of the title character.

In 1998, Davidtz played a theologian helping Denzel Washington crack a supernatural wave of crimes in the mystery drama Fallen and a femme fatale linked to Kenneth Branagh in Robert Altman's The Gingerbread Man. The following year, Davidtz portrayed a 19th-century woman of the world in Patricia Rozema's reworking of the Jane Austen comedy Mansfield Park and played a dual role opposite Robin Williams in the futuristic fable Bicentennial Man.

A supporting role in the 2001 film Bridget Jones' Diary saw Davidtz play Natasha, a colleague and one of the love interests of Mark Darcy (Colin Firth). That year, she began her run on the CBS drama Citizen Baines, playing the daughter of a defeated United States Senate incumbent (James Cromwell) who is herself leaning towards a career in politics. Other roles included horror thrillers like 2001's Thirteen Ghosts alongside Tony Shalhoub. In 2002, she appeared in the Michael Hoffman drama The Emperor's Club.

In Junebug (2005), she played an outsider art dealer from Chicago brought to North Carolina to meet her husband's family for the first time. Davidtz has also guest-starred on the ABC drama series Grey's Anatomy as Dr. Derek Shepherd's sister Nancy in the Season 3 episode "Let the Angels Commit". In 2008, she had a regular role on HBO's In Treatment as Amy, part of a fractious couple alongside Josh Charles's Jake.

She portrayed the unfaithful and unfortunate wife of Anthony Hopkins's character in the 2007 drama Fracture.

From 2009 to 2012, she played Rebecca Pryce, wife of Lane Pryce, in the AMC television show Mad Men. She also played Felicia Koons, the wife of the dean and the mother of Becca's best friend, Chelsea, on Showtime's Californication.

Davidtz played Annika Blomkvist in the 2011 English language version of The Girl with the Dragon Tattoo. She also briefly appeared in the 2012 Spider-Man reboot The Amazing Spider-Man as Mary Parker, Peter Parker's missing mother.

Personal life
Davidtz married entertainment attorney Jason Sloane on June 22, 2002, and they have two children. The family lives in Los Angeles.

Davidtz has a younger sister who, as of April 2009, was a psychologist at Nova Southeastern University in Fort Lauderdale, Florida.

In an interview regarding her guest appearances in 2016 on Ray Donovan, in which she portrayed a breast-cancer survivor, Davidtz revealed that she had been diagnosed with breast cancer in 2013, which had caused her to stop working and for which she underwent a mastectomy. The role was Davidtz's first after undergoing treatment, and when informed that it required nudity, Davidtz worked with producer David Hollander to incorporate her partially-reconstructed right breast into the story, turning down the use of a prosthetic as a substitute for her right nipple that was due to be restored through surgery. "Somebody might not believe it if an actress pretended to have their nipple gone and said, 'Look, I'm still sexual and pretty.' But when it's real, I hope it makes someone feel beautiful. I still feel beautiful," said Davidtz regarding the message she wished to convey by taking the role.

Filmography

Film

Television

References

External links
 

Living people
21st-century South African actresses
Actors from Trenton, New Jersey
Actresses from New Jersey
Afrikaner people
American emigrants to South Africa
American film actresses
American television actresses
American voice actresses
American people of Afrikaner descent
American people of Dutch descent
American people of English descent
American people of French descent
American people of South African descent
Rhodes University alumni
South African film actresses
South African television actresses
South African voice actresses
South African people of American descent
South African people of French descent
White South African people
1965 births